is a racing driver from Japan who currently competes in Super Formula, and Super GT.

Career
Kotaka made his debut in formula racing in 2015, racing for TOM'S from the second race weekend in the F4 Japanese Championship. He regularly finished in the top 10, with a fourth place finish at the Suzuka International Racing Course as his best result. He finished sixth in the championship with 50 points.

In 2016, Kotaka remained active in Japanese Formula 4 with TOM'S. He won two races at Fuji Speedway and another at Sportsland SUGO. He later took another podium finish at Fuji, but achieved erratic results for the remainder of the season. He finished fifth overall with 113 points.

In 2017, Kotaka did not race, but in 2018 he returned to Japanese Formula 4 at TOM's. He missed the first race weekend, but nevertheless he won two races at Fuji and was on the podium in seven other races. With 188 points, he finished third in the standings behind Yuki Tsunoda and Teppei Natori. At the end of the season, he made his Japanese Formula 3 Championship debut with Hanashima Racing over the weekend at SUGO. He scored a point with sixth in the final race and was classified thirteenth in the final standings.

In 2019, Kotaka started the year in the New Zealand racing in the Toyota Racing Series with the team MTEC Motorsport. He took a podium finish in the season finale at the Manfeild: Circuit Chris Amon, finishing the season in tenth place with 176 points. He then made his debut as a full-time driver in Japanese Formula 3 with the Corolla Chukyo Kuo TOM'S team. He took five podiums: one at Suzuka, three at SUGO and one at the Twin Ring Motegi, but he also had to miss two race weekends. He finished fifth in the final standings with 48 points. He also drove for the team apr in the GT300 class of the Super GT in the two races at Fuji sharing a McLaren 720S GT3 with Hiroaki Nagai and Manabu Orido, but scored no points.

In 2020, Kotaka remained active in Japanese Formula 3, which had changed its name to Super Formula Lights, with the TOM'S team. He won one race in the final race weekend at Fuji and was on the podium in ten other races. With 73 points, he finished third in the final standings behind Ritomo Miyata and Sena Sakaguchi. He also competed full-time in the GT300 class of the Super GT with the team Advics muta Racing INGING, sharing a Toyota 86 MC GT300 with Ryohei Sakaguchi. The two took two pole positions at Fuji and two podiums at Suzuka and Fuji. They finished ninth in the championship with 34 points.

In 2021 Kotaka would continue to drive in the 2021 Super Formula Lights at TOM'S. However, he missed the first two race weekends as he made his Super Formula debut that year with the carrozzeria Team KCMG as a replacement for Kamui Kobayashi, who was unable to fly to Japan due to travel restrictions due to the COVID-19 pandemic. He ended up competing in all but one round of the series,  but didn't manage to score a single point. Kotaka still raced in Super Formula Lights, albeit only for one round, where he managed to get 2 podiums.

Racing record

Career summary

‡ Team standings.

Complete Toyota Racing Series results 
(key) (Races in bold indicate pole position) (Races in italics indicate fastest lap)

Complete FIA Motorsport Games results

Complete Super Formula Lights results 
(key) (Races in bold indicate pole position) (Races in italics indicate fastest lap)

Complete Super Formula results
(key) (Races in bold indicate pole position; races in italics indicate fastest lap)

* Season still in progress.

References

External links
 

1999 births
Living people
Japanese racing drivers
Japanese Formula 3 Championship drivers
Super GT drivers
Super Formula drivers
Toyota Racing Series drivers
TOM'S drivers
KCMG drivers
Toyota Gazoo Racing drivers
FIA Motorsport Games drivers
21st-century Japanese people
Japanese F4 Championship drivers